The 2007 World Table Tennis Championships women's singles event took place in Zagreb, Croatia, between May 21 and May 27, 2007.

Seeds

  Zhang Yining (semifinals)
  Wang Nan (quarterfinals)
  Guo Yan (semifinals)
  Guo Yue (champion)
  Li Xiaoxia (final)
  Tie Ya Na (second round)
  Li Jiawei (third round)
  Wang Yuegu (fourth round)
  Jiang Huajun (third round)
  Ai Fukuhara (third round)
  Kim Kyung-ah (quarterfinals)
  Gao Jun (third round)
  Liu Jia (fourth round)
  Li Jiao (fourth round)
  Lin Ling (third round)
  Sayaka Hirano (third round)
  Sun Beibei (third round)
  Zhang Rui (third round)
  Park Mi-young (third round)
  Haruna Fukuoka (second round)
  Wu Jiaduo (third round)
  Wenling Tan Monfardini (third round)
  Viktoria Pavlovich (first round)
  Lau Sui Fei (fourth round)
  Krisztina Tóth (third round)
  Tamara Boroš (second round)
  Nikoleta Stefanova (second round)
  Nicole Struse (third round)
  Svetlana Ganina (third round)
  Elke Schall (second round)
  Moon Hyun-jung (second round)
  Peng Luyang (quarterfinals)

Finals

Main draw

Top half

Section 1

Section 2

Section 3

Section 4

Bottom half

Section 5

Section 6

Section 7

Section 8

References

External links
Drawsheet - Women's singles

-
World
2007 in Croatian women's sport